751 Faïna (prov. designation:  or ) is a very large background asteroid from the central regions of the asteroid belt, approximately  in diameter. It was discovered on 28 April 1913, by Russian astronomer Grigory Neujmin at the Simeiz Observatory on the Crimean peninsula. The elongated C-type asteroid (Ch) has a rotation period of 23.7 hours. It was named after Faina Mikhajlovna Neujmina, colleague and first wife of the discoverer.

Orbit and classification 

Located close to the region of the stony Eunomia family, Faïna is a non-family asteroid of the main belt's background population when applying the modern synthetic hierarchical clustering method (HCM) by Nesvorný as well as Milani and Knežević (AstDys). However, in the 1995 HCM-analysis by Zappalà, Faïna is the parent body of the tiny Faïna family, which is not recognized by modern analysis. The HCM-method is based on an object's proper orbital elements to group asteroids into families.

Faïna orbits the Sun in the central asteroid belt at a distance of 2.2–2.9 AU once every 4 years and 1 month (1,489 days; semi-major axis of 2.55 AU). Its orbit has an eccentricity of 0.15 and an inclination of 16° with respect to the ecliptic. The body's observation arc begins at Vienna Observatory on 8 May 2013, or two weeks after its official discovery observation by Grigory Neujmin at Simeiz.

Naming 

This minor planet was named after Faina Mikhajlovna Neujmina, the first wife of the discoverer. Astronomer Lutz Schmadel compiled this , based on his private communication with "N. S. Samojlova-Yakhontova", as neither the Minor Planet Circulars nor The Names of the Minor Planets give any information about this asteroid's name.

Physical characteristics 

In the Tholen classification, Faïna is a common, carbonaceous C-type asteroid, while in the Bus–Binzel SMASS classification, it is a hydrated carbonaceous Ch-type.

Rotation period 

In late 1988, a rotational lightcurve of Faïna was obtained from photometric observations by Richard Miles at the Manley Observatory near Chester in northwest England. Lightcurve analysis gave a well-defined rotation period of  hours with a brightness variation of  magnitude.

Diameter and albedo 

The Collaborative Asteroid Lightcurve Link adopts the results from IRAS, that is, an albedo of 0.0497 and a diameter of 110.50 kilometers based on an absolute magnitude of 8.66.

These timed observations are taken when the asteroid passes in front of a distant star.

References

External links 
 Lightcurve Database Query (LCDB), at www.minorplanet.info
 Dictionary of Minor Planet Names, Google books
 Asteroids and comets rotation curves, CdR – Geneva Observatory, Raoul Behrend
 Discovery Circumstances: Numbered Minor Planets (1)-(5000) – Minor Planet Center
 
 

000751
000751
Discoveries by Grigory Neujmin
Named minor planets
000751
000751
19130428